Trubshaw or Trubshawe is a family name, and may refer to:

People
 Brian Trubshaw (1924–2001), British test pilot
 Charles Trubshaw (1841–1917), English architect
 Gwendoline Trubshaw (1887–1954), Welsh public sector official
 James Trubshaw (1777–1853), British architect and civil engineer
 Michael Trubshawe (1905–1985), British actor
 Roy Trubshaw (born 1959), computer specialist
 Wilfred Trubshaw (died 1944), British solicitor and police officer

Fictional characters
 Nicholas Anthony Kemble in Eric Malpass's novel Oh My Darling Daughter (1970), commonly referred to as Trubshaw
 Chief-Inspector Eustace Trubshawe, in two whodunits by Gilbert Adair, The Act of Roger Murgatroyd (2006) and A Mysterious Affair of Style (2007)